Northwest Austin Municipal Utility District No. 1 v. Holder, 557 U.S. 193 (2009), was a decision of the United States Supreme Court regarding Section 5 of the Voting Rights Act of 1965, and in particular its requirement that proposed electoral-law changes in certain states must be approved by the federal government.  In a 9–0 decision, the Court concluded that the district was eligible to apply for an exemption (bailout) from this section per Section 4(a), because the definition of "political subdivision" in Section 14(c)(2) included a district of this nature. In an 8–1 opinion, the Court declined to rule on the constitutionality of that provision, citing the principle of constitutional avoidance.

Background
The appellant is a small utility district located northwest of Austin, Texas.  The district is run by an elected board.

The District never had any history or claims of racial discrimination in any of its elections.  However, because the district is located in Texas, it was subject to the requirements of §5 of the Voting Rights Act of 1965 (the Act, which applies to states with a history of discrimination, especially in the South given Jim Crow-era laws) and extends to any "political subdivision" within the state.

However, another section of the Act, §4(a), allows a political subdivision to seek "bailout" (i.e., release from the preclearance requirements) if certain conditions are met.  The District thus filed suit in the United States District Court for the District of Columbia, seeking bailout under §4(a).  The District argued in the alternative that, if §5 were interpreted to render it ineligible for bailout, §5 was unconstitutional.

The District Court rejected both claims. It concluded that bailout under §4(a) is available only to counties, parishes, and subunits that register voters, not to an entity like the district that does not register its own voters. It also concluded that a 2006 amendment extending §5 for 25 years was constitutional.

Arguments were held on April 29, 2009. Chief Justice Roberts and Justice Alito questioned why Congress did not extend §5 to all 50 states.

Opinion of the Court

Section I [legal and historical background]

In Part A, Roberts described the Fifteenth Amendment's problematic history of enforcement that led to the passage of the Voting Rights Act, much of which consists of a "scheme of stringent remedies aimed at areas where voting discrimination has been most flagrant."  These remedies were bolstered by §5, which suspended any change in state election procedure until the federal government certified that it neither "has the purpose nor will have the effect of denying or abridging the right to vote on account of race or color." To confine these remedies to areas of flagrant disenfranchisement, the Act applied them only to States that met certain explicit standards. However, recognizing that this coverage formula "might bring within its sweep governmental units not guilty of any unlawful discriminatory voting practices, [Congress] afforded such jurisdictions immediately available protection in the form of ... [a] 'bailout' suit."

Roberts then laid out the requirements of such a suit under D. C. 42 U. S. C. §§1973b.  He noted that §§4 and 5 were temporary provisions—they were originally expected to be in effect for only five years. §4(a), 79 Stat. 438.  However, Congress reauthorized the Act in 1970 (for 5 years), 1975 (for 7 years), and 1982 (for 25 years); each reauthorization was litigated as unconstitutional, and each time the Supreme Court upheld its constitutionality.  Most recently, in 2006, Congress extended §5 for yet another 25 years. It was this latest extension that was now before the court.

Part B characterized the procedural history of the District's suit.

Section II [Constitutional claim]

In Section II, Justice Roberts acknowledged the "undeniable" historic accomplishments of the Voting Rights Act.  However, the Act "now raises serious constitutional concerns."  In particular, §5, "which authorizes federal intrusion into sensitive areas of state and local policymaking, imposes substantial 'federalism costs,' " costs which  have caused Members of this Court to express serious misgivings about the constitutionality of §5.  Meanwhile, some of the conditions that the Court relied upon when it previously upheld this statutory scheme have unquestionably improved. "Those improvements are no doubt due in significant part to the Voting Rights Act itself, and stand as a monument to its success," but the Act imposes current burdens and must be justified by current needs. The Act also differentiates between the States in ways that may no longer be justified.
 
The Court recognizes that judging the constitutionality of an Act of Congress is "the gravest and most delicate duty that this Court is called upon to perform." The District Court found that Congress's contributions to the record documented continuing racial discrimination, and that §5 deterred discriminatory changes. Here, the district does provide such other grounds:  it raises a statutory claim that it is eligible to bail out under §§4 and 5. The existence of this claim invokes this principle of "Constitutional avoidance," as characterized in Escambia County v. McMillan.

The Court disagreed with Justice Thomas's argument that this principle has no pertinence here. He contends that even if the Court resolved the district's statutory argument in its favor, it would still have to reach the constitutional question, because the district's statutory argument would not afford it all the relief it seeks. However, the district expressly describes its constitutional challenge to §5 as being "in the alternative" to its statutory argument. The district's counsel confirmed this at oral argument.

Section III [Statutory claim]

In Section III, Roberts addressed the district's narrower argument that it is eligible for a bailout under the requirements of §§4 and 5.  The question hinged on the intended definition of the term "[P]olitical subdivision" as used in §14(c)(2).  The Court concluded that "all political subdivisions--not only those described in §14(c)(2)--are eligible to file a bailout suit," thus overturning the district court.
The Act must be interpreted to permit all political subdivisions, including the district, to seek to bail out from the preclearance requirements. It is undisputed that the district is a "political subdivision" in the ordinary sense, but the Act also provides a narrower definition in §14(c)(2): " '[P]olitical subdivision' shall mean any county or parish, except that where registration for voting is not conducted under the supervision of a county or parish, the term shall include any other subdivision of a State which conducts registration for voting." The court below concluded that the district did not qualify for §4(a) bailout under this definition, but specific precedent, the Act's structure, and underlying constitutional concerns compel a broader reading.
This Court has already established that §14(c)(2)'s definition does not apply to the term "political subdivision" in §5's preclearance provision. Rather, the "definition was intended to operate only for purposes of determining which political units in nondesignated States may be separately designated for coverage under §4(b)." "[O]nce a State has been [so] designated . . . , [the] definition . . . has no operative significance in determining [§5's] reach." In light of these decisions, §14(c)(2)'s definition should not constrict the availability of bailout either.
The Government responds that any such argument is foreclosed by City of Rome v. United States. In 1982, however, Congress expressly repudiated City of Rome by amending the Act to allow political subdivisions of a state to seek bailout, even if the state itself was ineligible for bailout. Thus, City of Rome's logic is no longer applicable.
The Government's contention that the district is subject to §5 under Sheffield not because it is a "political subdivision" but because it is a "State" is counterintuitive and similarly untenable after the 1982 amendments.  The Government's contrary interpretation has helped to render the bailout provision all but a nullity. Since 1982, only 17 jurisdictions—out of the more than 12,000 covered political subdivisions—have successfully bailed out of the Act. It is unlikely that Congress intended the provision to have such limited effect.

Concurrence in part; dissent in part
Justice Clarence Thomas concurred in part and dissented in part.

He concurred with the judgment that the District should be able to file a bailout suit.  However, he dissented from the majority's decision not to address the constitutionality of §5, and argued that §5 is no longer constitutional (a position he would take once again in Shelby County v. Holder when the issue of §5's constitutionality would once again be raised).

Section I

Section II

See also 
List of United States Supreme Court cases, volume 557
List of United States Supreme Court cases

References

External links
 
Exhaustive list of sources at scotuswiki.com
Audio of Oral Arguments at C-Span
[ Docket]
Justices Let Stand a Central Provision of Voting Rights Act (NYT)

United States Supreme Court cases
History of voting rights in the United States
2009 in United States case law
United States Fifteenth Amendment case law
United States elections case law
Hays County, Texas
Public utilities of the United States
United States Supreme Court cases of the Roberts Court